Wronski or Wroński (feminine: Wrońska, plural: Wrońscy) is a Polish surname. Czech, Ukrainian and Russian variants include Vronski and Vronsky (feminine: Vronska, Vronskaya). It may refer to:

People 
 Józef Maria Hoene-Wroński (1776-1853), Polish philosopher and mathematician (see Wronskian)
 Peter Vronsky, Canadian filmmaker and writer
 Petr Vronský (born 1946), Czech conductor
 Sergei Arkadevich Vronsky (1923-2003), Soviet and Russian cinematographer
 Eugenia Vronskaya (born 1966), Russian painter

Fictional characters 
 Alexei Vronsky, a character of Leo Tolstoy's novel Anna Karenina

See also 
 Vronsky & Babin

Slavic-language surnames
Polish-language surnames
Jewish surnames